The 2013 ICF Canoe Sprint World Championships was held 29 August–1 September 2013 in Duisburg, Germany. The championships were awarded originally to Szeged, Hungary, but Szeged was moved to 2011 in the wake of Vichy, France's withdrawal in 2010 and awarded to Rio de Janeiro, who withdrew in September 2012. Consequently, the World Championships were awarded to Duisburg.

The 2012 ICF Paracanoe World Championships were held the previous year as a standalone event but the 2012 ICF Canoe Sprint World Championships were not since the competition is not held in Olympic years.

Explanation of events
Canoe sprint competitions are broken up into Canadian canoe (C), an open canoe with a single-blade paddle, or in kayaks (K), a closed canoe with a double-bladed paddle. Each canoe or kayak can hold one person (1), two people (2), or four people (4). When a competition is listed as a C-2 500 m event as an example, it means two people are in a canoe competing at a  distance.

Participating nations
Athletes from 76 countries participated in the championships.

  (3)
  (13)
  (3)
  (22)
  (4)
  (7)
  (21)
  (6)
  (16)
  (8)
  (30)
  (9)
  (12)
  (6)
  (1)
  (5)
  (1)
  (29)
  (11)
  (3)
  (2)
  (6)
  (22)
  (4)
  (34)
  (23)
  (1)
  (1)
  (37)
  (10)
  (11)
  (2)
  (5)
  (5)
  (25)
  (14)
  (11)
  (1)
  (3)
  (18)
  (11)
  (2)
  (2)
  (17)
  (4)
  (1)
  (1)
  (2)
  (9)
  (4)
  (32)
  (7)
  (1)
  (18)
  (40)
  (1)
  (3)
  (19)
  (2)
  (15)
  (3)
  (5)
  (11)
  (31)
  (10)
  (1)
  (1)
  (2)
  (1)
  (1)
  (1)
  (32)
  (15)
  (4)
  (6)
  (1)

Medal summary

Medal tables

Canoe

Paracanoe

Men
 Non-Olympic classes

Canoe

Kayak

Women
 Non-Olympic classes

Canoe

Kayak

Paracanoe
 Non-Paralympic classes

References

ICF Bidding Questionnaire: 2013 ICF Canoe Sprint World Championships Szeged. – accessed 11 April 2010.

External links

ICF Canoe Sprint World Championships
ICF Canoe Sprint World Championships
2013
2013 ICF Canoe Sprint World Championships
Canoeing and kayaking competitions in Germany